Usury is the practice of making unethical or immoral monetary loans that unfairly enrich the lender. The term may be used in a moral sense—condemning taking advantage of others' misfortunes—or in a legal sense, where an interest rate is charged in excess of the maximum rate that is allowed by law. A loan may be considered usurious because of excessive or abusive interest rates or other factors defined by the laws of a state. Someone who practices usury can be called a usurer, but in modern colloquial English may be called a loan shark.

In many historical societies including ancient Christian, Jewish, and Islamic societies, usury meant the charging of interest of any kind, and was considered wrong, or was made illegal.  During the Sutra period in India (7th to 2nd centuries BC) there were laws prohibiting the highest castes from practicing usury. Similar condemnations are found in religious texts from Buddhism, Judaism (ribbit in Hebrew), Christianity, and Islam (riba in Arabic). At times, many states from ancient Greece to ancient Rome have outlawed loans with any interest. Though the Roman Empire eventually allowed loans with carefully restricted interest rates, the Catholic Church in medieval Europe, as well as the Reformed Churches, regarded the charging of interest at any rate as sinful (as well as charging a fee for the use of money, such as at a bureau de change). Religious prohibitions on usury are predicated upon the belief that charging interest on a loan is a sin.

History
Usury (in the original sense of any interest) was denounced by religious leaders and philosophers in the ancient world, including Moses, Plato, Aristotle, Cato, Cicero, Seneca, Aquinas,   Gautama Buddha and Muhammad.

Certain negative historical renditions of usury carry with them social connotations of perceived "unjust" or "discriminatory" lending practices. The historian Paul Johnson, comments:

Theological historian John Noonan argues that "the doctrine [of usury] was enunciated by popes, expressed by three ecumenical councils, proclaimed by bishops, and taught unanimously by theologians."

Roman Empire
Banking during the Roman Empire was different from modern banking. During the Principate period, most banking activities were conducted by private individuals who operated as large banking firms do today. Anybody that had any available liquid assets and wished to lend it out could easily do so.

The annual rates of interest on loans varied in the range of 4–12 percent, but when the interest rate was higher, it typically was not 15–16 percent but either 24 percent or 48 percent. They quoted them on a monthly basis, and the most common rates were multiples of twelve. Monthly rates tended to range from simple fractions to 3–4 percent, perhaps because lenders used Roman numerals.

Moneylending during this period was largely a matter of private loans advanced to persons persistently in debt or temporarily so until harvest time. Mostly, it was undertaken by exceedingly rich men prepared to take on a high risk if the profit looked good; interest rates were fixed privately and were almost entirely unrestricted by law. Investment was always regarded as a matter of seeking personal profit, often on a large scale. Banking was of the small, back-street variety, run by the urban lower-middle class of petty shopkeepers. By the 3rd century, acute currency problems in the Empire drove such banking into decline. The rich who were in a position to take advantage of the situation became the moneylenders when the increasing tax demands in the last declining days of the Empire crippled and eventually destroyed the peasant class by reducing tenant-farmers to serfs. It was evident that usury meant exploitation of the poor.

Cicero, in the second book of his treatise De Officiis, relates the following conversation between an unnamed questioner and Cato:

Judaism

Jews are forbidden from usury in dealing with fellow Jews, although not exclusively. Lending is to be considered tzedakah. However, there are permissions to charge interest on loans to non-Jews, restricted to cases when there is no other means of subsistence "If we nowadays allow interest to be taken from non-Jews, it is because there is no end to the yoke and the burden king and ministers impose on us, and everything we take is the minimum for our subsistence, and anyhow we are condemned to live in the midst of the nations and cannot earn our living in any other manner except by money dealings with them; therefore the taking of interest is not to be prohibited" (Tos. to BM 70b S.V. tashikh).

This is outlined in the Jewish scriptures, specifically in the Torah:

Johnson contends that the Torah treats lending as philanthropy in a poor community whose aim was collective survival, but which is not obliged to be charitable towards outsiders.

As Jewish people were ostracized from most professions by local rulers during the Middle Ages, the Western churches and the guilds, they were pushed into marginal occupations considered socially inferior, such as tax and rent collecting and moneylending. Natural tensions between creditors and debtors were added to social, political, religious, and economic strains.

Several historical rulings in Jewish law have mitigated the allowances for usury toward non-Jews. For instance, the 15th-century commentator Rabbi Isaac Abarbanel specified that the rubric for allowing interest does not apply to Christians or Muslims, because their faith systems have a common ethical basis originating from Judaism. The medieval commentator Rabbi David Kimhi extended this principle to non-Jews who show consideration for Jews, saying they should be treated with the same consideration when they borrow.

Christianity

Bible
The Old Testament "condemns the practice of charging interest on a poor person because a loan should be an act of compassion and taking care of one’s neighbor"; it teaches that "making a profit off a loan from a poor person is exploiting that person (Exodus 22:25–27)." Similarly, charging of interest or the taking of clothing as pledges is condemned in Ezekiel 18 (early 6th century BC), and Deuteronomy 23:19 prohibits the taking of interest in the form of money or food when lending to a "brother"; it is not clear if this refers to an actual brother, a fellow Israelite or any human being.

The New Testament likewise teaches giving rather than loaning money to those who need it:
"And if you lend to those from whom you expect repayment, what credit is that to you? Even sinners lend to sinners, expecting to be repaid in full. But love your enemies, do good to them, and lend to them, expecting nothing in return. Then your reward will be great, and you will be sons of the Most High; for He is kind to the ungrateful and wicked. Be merciful, just as your Father is merciful. - Luke 6:34-36 NIV

Church councils
The First Council of Nicaea, in 325, forbade clergy from engaging in usury

At the time, usury was interest of any kind, and the canon forbade the clergy to lend money at interest rates even as low as 1 percent per year. Later ecumenical councils applied this regulation to the laity.

Lateran III decreed that persons who accepted interest on loans could receive neither the sacraments nor Christian burial. 

The Council of Vienne made the belief in the right to usury a heresy in 1311, and condemned all secular legislation that allowed it.

Up to the 16th century, usury was condemned by the Catholic Church, but not really defined. During the Fifth Lateran Council, in the 10th session (in the year 1515), the Council for the first time gave a definition of usury:

The Fifth Lateran Council, in the same declaration, gave explicit approval of charging a fee for services so long as no profit was made in the case of Mounts of Piety:

Pope Sixtus V condemned the practice of charging interest as "detestable to God and man, damned by the sacred canons, and contrary to Christian charity.

Medieval theology
The first of the scholastic Christian theologians, Saint Anselm of Canterbury, led the shift in thought that labelled charging interest the same as theft. Previously usury had been seen as a lack of charity.

St. Thomas Aquinas, the leading scholastic theologian of the Catholic Church, argued charging of interest is wrong because it amounts to "double charging", charging for both the thing and the use of the thing. Aquinas said this would be morally wrong in the same way as if one sold a bottle of wine, charged for the bottle of wine, and then charged for the person using the wine to actually drink it. Similarly, one cannot charge for a piece of cake and for the eating of the piece of cake. Yet this, said Aquinas, is what usury does. Money is a medium of exchange, and is used up when it is spent. To charge for the money and for its use (by spending) is therefore to charge for the money twice. It is also to sell time since the usurer charges, in effect, for the time that the money is in the hands of the borrower. Time, however, is not a commodity for which anyone can charge. In condemning usury Aquinas was much influenced by the recently rediscovered philosophical writings of Aristotle and his desire to assimilate Greek philosophy with Christian theology. Aquinas argued that in the case of usury, as in other aspects of Christian revelation, Christian doctrine is reinforced by Aristotelian natural law rationalism. Aristotle's argument is that interest is unnatural, since money, as a sterile element, cannot naturally reproduce itself. Thus, usury conflicts with natural law just as it offends Christian revelation: see Thought of Thomas Aquinas. As such, Aquinas taught "that interest is inherently unjust and one who charges interest sins."

Outlawing usury did not prevent investment, but stipulated that in order for the investor to share in the profit he must share the risk. In short he must be a joint-venturer. Simply to invest the money and expect it to be returned regardless of the success of the venture was to make money simply by having money and not by taking any risk or by doing any work or by any effort or sacrifice at all, which is usury. St Thomas quotes Aristotle as saying that "to live by usury is exceedingly unnatural". Islam likewise condemns usury but allowed commerce (Al-Baqarah 2:275) – an alternative that suggests investment and sharing of profit and loss instead of sharing only profit through interests. Judaism condemns usury towards Jews, but allows it towards non-Jews (Deut 23:19–20). St Thomas allows, however, charges for actual services provided. Thus a banker or credit-lender could charge for such actual work or effort as he did carry out e.g. any fair administrative charges. The Catholic Church, in a decree of the Fifth Council of the Lateran, expressly allowed such charges in respect of credit-unions run for the benefit of the poor known as "montes pietatis".

In the 13th century Cardinal Hostiensis enumerated thirteen situations in which charging interest was not immoral. The most important of these was lucrum cessans (profits given up) which allowed for the lender to charge interest "to compensate him for profit foregone in investing the money himself."  This idea is very similar to opportunity cost. Many scholastic thinkers who argued for a ban on interest charges also argued for the legitimacy of lucrum cessans profits (e.g. Pierre Jean Olivi and St. Bernardino of Siena). However, Hostiensis' exceptions, including for lucrum cessans, were never accepted as official by the Catholic Church.

Pope Benedict XIV's encyclical Vix Pervenit (1745), operating in the pre-industrial mindset , gives the reasons why usury is sinful:
The nature of the sin called usury has its proper place and origin in a loan contract… [which] demands, by its very nature, that one return to another only as much as he has received. The sin rests on the fact that sometimes the creditor desires more than he has given…, but any gain which exceeds the amount he gave is illicit and usurious.One cannot condone the sin of usury by arguing that the gain is not great or excessive, but rather moderate or small; neither can it be condoned by arguing that the borrower is rich; nor even by arguing that the money borrowed is not left idle, but is spent usefully…

15th through 19th century 
Martin Luther opposed several forms of usury, publishing and republishing multiple treatises on the subject. Christians, Luther argued, should not act in self-defense, should give when asked, and in the lowest degree should lend, expecting nothing in return. On those grounds, making a loan with anticipated profits (and with required repayment and hence little risk for the lender) is a form of self-service that goes against love of neighbor. Defining "lend" as lending without interest or fee, Luther encourages lending for the purpose of aiding the borrower.

The Westminster Larger Catechism, part of the Westminster Standards held as doctrinal documents by Presbyterian churches, teaches that usury is a sin prohibited by the eighth commandment.

Concerns about usury included the 19th century Rothschild loans to the Holy See and 16th century concerns over abuse of the zinskauf clause. This was problematic because the charging of interest (although not all interest – see above for Fifth Lateran Council) can be argued to be a violation of doctrine at the time, such as that reflected in the 1745 encyclical Vix pervenit. To prevent any claims of doctrine violation, work-arounds would sometimes be employed. For example, in the 15th century, the Medici Bank lent money to the Vatican, which was lax about repayment. Rather than charging interest, "the Medici overcharged the pope on the silks and brocades, the jewels and other commodities they supplied." However, the 1917 Code of Canon Law switched position and allowed church monies to be used to accrue interest.

The Catholic Church has always condemned usury, but in modern times, with the rise of capitalism, the previous assumptions about the very nature of money have been challenged, and the Church had to update its understanding of what constitutes usury to also include the new reality. Thus, the Church refers, among other things, to the fact Mosaic Law doesn't ban all interest taking (proving interest-taking is not an inherently immoral act, same principle as with homicide), as well as the prevalence of bonds & loans paying interest. Because of this, as the old Catholic Encyclopedia put it, "Since the possession of an object is generally useful, I may require the price of that general utility, even when the object is of no use to me."

Jesuit philosopher Joseph Rickaby, writing at the beginning of the 20th century, put the development of economy in relation to usury this way:

He further gave the following view of the development of Catholic practice:

Modern era 
The Congregation of the Missionary Sons of the Immaculate Heart of Mary, a Catholic Christian religious order, teaches that the charging of interest is sinful. Theology professor Kevin Considine argues that usury remains a sin if it takes advantage of the needy or where the source of the interest is sinful

Islam

Riba (usury) is forbidden in Islam. As such, specialized codes of banking have developed to cater to investors wishing to obey Qur'anic law. (See Islamic banking)

The following quotations are English translations from the Qur'an:

Those who consume interest will stand (on Judgment Day) like those driven to madness by Satan’s touch. That is because they say, “Trade is no different than interest.” But Allah has permitted trading and forbidden interest. Whoever refrains—after having received warning from their Lord—may keep their previous gains, and their case is left to Allah. As for those who persist, it is they who will be the residents of the Fire. They will be there forever. (Al-Baqarah 2:275)

Allah has made interest fruitless and charity fruitful. And Allah does not like any ungrateful evildoer. Indeed, those who believe, do good, establish prayer, and pay alms-tax will receive their reward from their Lord, and there will be no fear for them, nor will they grieve. O believers! Fear Allah, and give up outstanding interest if you are (true) believers. If you do not, then beware of a war with Allah and His Messenger! But if you repent, you may retain your principal—neither inflicting nor suffering harm. If it is difficult for someone to repay a debt, postpone it until a time of ease. And if you waive it as an act of charity, it will be better for you, if only you knew. (Al-Baqarah 2:276–280)

O believers! Do not consume interest, multiplying it many times over. And be mindful of Allah, so you may prosper. (Al-'Imran 3:130)

We forbade the Jews certain foods that had been lawful to them for their wrongdoing, and for hindering many from the Way of Allah, taking interest despite its prohibition, and consuming people’s wealth unjustly. We have prepared for the disbelievers among them a painful punishment. (Al-Nisa 4:160–161)

Whatever loans you give,  seeking interest at the expense of people’s wealth, will not increase with Allah. But whatever charity you give, seeking the pleasure of Allah—it is they whose reward will be multiplied. (Ar-Rum 30:39)

The attitude of Muhammad to usury is articulated in his Last Sermon:Verily your blood, your property are as sacred and inviolable as the sacredness of this day of yours, in this month of yours, in this town of yours. Behold! Everything pertaining to the Days of Ignorance is under my feet completely abolished. Abolished are also the blood-revenges of the Days of Ignorance. The first claim of ours on blood-revenge which I abolish is that of the son of Rabi'a b. al-Harith, who was nursed among the tribe of Sa'd and killed by Hudhail. And the usury of the pre-Islamic period is abolished, and the first of our usury I abolish is that of 'Abbas b. 'Abd al-Muttalib, for it is all abolished.One of the forbidden usury models in Islam is to take advantage when lending money. Examples of forbidden loans, such as a person borrowing 1000 dollars and the borrower is required to return 1100 dollars. The above agreement is a form of transaction which is a burden for people who borrow, because in Islam, lending and borrowing are social transactions aimed at helping others, not like a sale and purchase agreement that is allowed to be profitable. Hence, a rule of thumb used by Islamic scholars is, "Every loan (qardh) which gives additional benefits is called usury."

England
In England, the departing Crusaders were joined by crowds of debtors in the massacres of Jews at London and York in 1189–1190. In 1275, Edward I of England passed the Statute of the Jewry which made usury illegal and linked it to blasphemy, in order to seize the assets of the violators. Scores of English Jews were arrested, 300 were hanged and their property went to the Crown. In 1290, all Jews were to be expelled from England, allowed to take only what they could carry; the rest of their property became the Crown's. Usury was cited as the official reason for the Edict of Expulsion; however, not all Jews were expelled: it was easy to avoid expulsion by converting to Christianity. Many other crowned heads of Europe expelled Jewish people, although again converts to Christianity were no longer considered Jewish. Many of these forced converts still secretly practiced their faith.

The growth of the Lombard bankers and pawnbrokers, who moved from city to city, was along the pilgrim routes.

In the 16th century, short-term interest rates dropped dramatically (from around 20–30% p.a. to around 9–10% p.a.). This was caused by refined commercial techniques, increased capital availability, the Reformation, and other reasons. The lower rates weakened religious scruples about lending at interest, although the debate did not cease altogether.

The 18th century papal prohibition on usury meant that it was a sin to charge interest on a money loan. As set forth by Thomas Aquinas in the 13th century, because money was invented to be an intermediary in exchange for goods, it is unjust to charge a fee to someone after giving them money. This is because transferring ownership of property implies the right to use that property for its purpose: "Accordingly if a man wanted to sell wine separately from the use of the wine, he would be selling the same thing twice, or he would be selling what does not exist, wherefore he would evidently commit a sin of injustice."

Charles Eisenstein has argued that pivotal change in the English-speaking world came with lawful rights to charge interest on lent money, particularly the 1545 Act, "An Act Against Usurie" (37 Hen. VIII, c. 9) of King Henry VIII of England.

In literature
In The Divine Comedy, Dante places the usurers in the inner ring of the seventh circle of hell.

Interest on loans, and the contrasting views on the morality of that practice held by Jews and Christians, is central to the plot of Shakespeare's play "The Merchant of Venice". Antonio is the merchant of the title, a Christian, who is forced by circumstance to borrow money from Shylock, a Jew. Shylock customarily charges interest on loans, seeing it as good business, while Antonio does not, viewing it as morally wrong. When Antonio defaults on his loan, Shylock famously demands the agreed upon penalty: a measured quantity of muscle from Antonio's chest. This is the source of the metaphorical phrase "a pound of flesh" often used to describe the dear price of a loan or business transaction. Shakespeare's play is a vivid portrait of the competing views of loans and use of interest, as well as the cultural strife between Jews and Christians that overlaps it. 

By the 18th century, usury was more often treated as a metaphor than a crime in itself, so Jeremy Bentham's Defence of Usury was not as shocking as it would have appeared two centuries earlier.

In Honoré de Balzac's 1830 novel Gobseck, the title character, who is a usurer, is described as both "petty and great – a miser and a philosopher..." The character Daniel Quilp in The Old Curiosity Shop by Charles Dickens is a usurer.

In the early 20th century Ezra Pound's anti-usury poetry was not primarily based on the moral injustice of interest payments but on the fact that excess capital was no longer devoted to artistic patronage, as it could now be used for capitalist business investment.

Usury law

Usury and the law

"When money is lent on a contract to receive not only the principal sum again, but also an increase by way of compensation for the use, the increase is called interest by those who think it lawful, and usury by those who do not." (William Blackstone's Commentaries on the Laws of England).

Canada
Canada's Criminal Code limits the interest rate to 60% per year.
The law is broadly written and Canada's courts have often intervened to remove ambiguity.

Japan
Japan has various laws restricting interest rates. Under civil law, the maximum interest rate is between 15% and 20% per year depending upon the principal amount (larger amounts having a lower maximum rate). Interest in excess of 20% is subject to criminal penalties (the criminal law maximum was 29.2% until it was lowered by legislation in 2010). Default interest on late payments may be charged at up to 1.46 times the ordinary maximum (i.e., 21.9% to 29.2%), while pawn shops may charge interest of up to 9% per month (i.e., 108% per year, however, if the loan extends more than the normal short-term pawn shop loan, the 9% per month rate compounded can make the annual rate in excess of 180%, before then most of these transaction would result in any goods pawned being forfeited).

United States
Usury laws are state laws that specify the maximum legal interest rate at which loans can be made. In the United States, the primary legal power to regulate usury rests primarily with the states. Each U.S. state has its own statute that dictates how much interest can be charged before it is considered usurious or unlawful.

If a lender charges above the lawful interest rate, a court will not allow the lender to sue to recover the unlawfully high interest, and some states will apply all payments made on the debt to the principal balance. In some states, such as New York, usurious loans are voided ab initio.

The making of usurious loans is often called loan sharking. That term is sometimes also applied to the practice of making consumer loans without a license in jurisdictions that requires lenders to be licensed.

Federal regulation
On a federal level, Congress has never attempted to federally regulate interest rates on purely private transactions, but on the basis of past U.S. Supreme Court decisions, arguably the U.S. Congress might have the power to do so under the interstate commerce clause of Article I of the Constitution.

Congress imposed a federal criminal penalty for unlawful interest rates through the Racketeer Influenced and Corrupt Organizations Act (RICO Statute), and its definition of "unlawful debt", which makes it a potential federal felony to lend money at an interest rate more than twice the local state usury rate and then try to collect that debt.

It is a federal offense to use violence or threats to collect usurious interest (or any other sort).

Separate federal rules apply to most banks. The U.S. Supreme Court held unanimously in the 1978 case, Marquette Nat. Bank of Minneapolis v. First of Omaha Service Corp., that the National Banking Act of 1863 allowed nationally chartered banks to charge the legal rate of interest in their state regardless of the borrower's state of residence.

In 1980, Congress passed the Depository Institutions Deregulation and Monetary Control Act.  Among the Act's provisions, it exempted federally chartered savings banks, installment plan sellers and chartered loan companies from state usury limits. Combined with the Marquette decision that applied to National Banks, this effectively overrode all state and local usury laws. The 1968 Truth in Lending Act does not regulate rates, except for some mortgages, but requires uniform or standardized disclosure of costs and charges.

In the 1996 Smiley v. Citibank case, the Supreme Court further limited states' power to regulate credit card fees and extended the reach of the Marquette decision. The court held that the word "interest" used in the 1863 banking law included fees and, therefore, states could not regulate fees.

Some members of Congress have tried to create a federal usury statute that would limit the maximum allowable interest rate, but the measures have not progressed. In July 2010, the Dodd–Frank Wall Street Reform and Consumer Protection Act, was signed into law by President Obama. The act provides for a Consumer Financial Protection Bureau to regulate some credit practices but has no interest rate limit.

Texas
State law in Texas also includes a provision for contracting for, charging, or receiving charges exceeding twice the amount authorized (A/K/A "double usury"). A person who violates this provision is liable to the obligor as an additional penalty for all principal or principal balance, as well as interest or time price differential. A person who is liable is also liable for reasonable attorney's fees incurred by the obligor.

Avoidance mechanisms and interest-free lending

Islamic banking 

In a partnership or joint venture where money is lent, the creditor only provides the capital yet is guaranteed a fixed amount of profit. The debtor, however, puts in time and effort, but is made to bear the risk of loss. Muslim scholars argue that such practice is unjust. As an alternative to usury, Islam strongly encourages charity and direct investment in which the creditor shares whatever profit or loss the business may incur (in modern terms, this amounts to an equity stake in the business).

Interest-free micro-lending
Growth of the Internet internationally has enabled both business micro-lending through sites such as Kickstarter as well as through global micro-lending charities where lenders make small sums of money available on zero-interest terms. Persons lending money to on-line micro-lending charity Kiva for example do not get paid any interest, although the end users to whom the loans are made may be charged interest by Kiva's partners in the country where the loan is used.

Non-recourse mortgages
A non-recourse loan is secured by the value of property (usually real estate) owned by the debtor. However, unlike other loans, which oblige the debtor to repay the amount borrowed, a non-recourse loan is fully satisfied merely by the transfer of the property to the creditor, even if the property has declined in value and is worth less than the amount borrowed. When such a loan is created, the creditor bears the risk that the property will decline sharply in value (in which case the creditor is repaid with property worth less than the amount borrowed), and the debtor does not bear the risk of decrease in property value (because the debtor is guaranteed the right to use the property, regardless of value, to satisfy the debt.)

Zinskauf

Zinskauf was a financial instrument, similar to an annuity, that rose to prominence in the Middle Ages. The decline of the Byzantine Empire led to a growth of capital in Europe, so the Catholic Church tolerated zinskauf as a way to avoid prohibitions on usury. Since zinskauf was an exchange of a fixed amount of money for annual income it was considered a sale rather than a loan. Martin Luther made zinskauf a subject of his Treatise on Usury and his Sermon on Trade and Usury  and criticized clerics of the Catholic Church for violating the spirit if not the letter of usury laws.

See also
 Chrematistics
 Christian finance
 Contractum trinius
 Debt-trap diplomacy
 Greed
 History of banking
 History of pawnbroking
 Loansharking (traditional occupation of Mafiosi)
 Money changing
 Payday loans
 Predatory lending
 Credit card interest
 Title loan
 Usury Act 1660

References

Further reading
 
 
 Dorin, Rowan (2023). No Return: Jews, Christian Usurers, and the Spread of Mass Expulsion in Medieval Europe. Princeton University Press.

External links

What Love Is This? A Renunciation of the Economics of Calvinism. The House of Degenhart.
S.C. Mooney's Response to Dr. Gary North's critique of Usury: Destroyer of Nations
What is Riba: Islamic definition of Usury
Usury laws by state.
Origin of Modern Banking and Usury in Britain. Heretical.com
Buddha on Right Livelihood and Usury
Thomas Geoghegan on "Infinite Debt: How Unlimited Interest Rates Destroyed the Economy"

 
Medieval economics
Economic bubbles
Property crimes
Negative Mitzvoth